is a term that covers various genres of popular woodblock-printed illustrated literature during the Japanese Edo period (1600–1868) and early Meiji period. These works were published in the city of Edo (modern Tokyo).

Early  (up to )

Characteristics of early  

At this period the pictures were considered to be of more importance than text. The text itself was mainly written in hiragana, although some kanji also appear. These early works are not of a high literary value, and are often derivative. However, they are often of interest to scholars from other fields as they provide a unique insight into the life, customs, and interests of the ordinary people of the time.

It is thought that these early works were enjoyed by a wide readership, and were especially appreciated by women and children.

Later

Works of these genres are conventionally categorised by the date of publication, with works dated before 1775 deemed  and those published in or after 1775 .

At first sight,  appears to be a simple retelling of the Chinese tale of Lu Sheng, a young man who falls asleep in the Zhao capital of Handan, and dreams of glory but wakes to find that the millet at his bedside has not even begun to boil. However, in the manner of a roman à clef the reader is given visual and textual clues that the characters actually represent contemporary figures such as the kabuki actor , and these figures' personal lives are parodied.

This is a development which changed the course of the  genre profoundly, and henceforth it is thought that the works were increasingly read by educated male adults.

were longer works, published from around 1807 until 1888.

Notes

References

Printmaking
Graphic design
Woodcut designers
Cultural history of Japan
Literary genres
Edo period
Japanese words and phrases